Sher Ali Arbab is a Pakistani politician who had been a member of the National Assembly of Pakistan from August 2018 till January 2023.

Political career
He was elected to the National Assembly of Pakistan as a candidate of Pakistan Tehreek-e-Insaf (PTI) from Constituency NA-30 (Peshawar-IV) in 2018 Pakistani general election. He received 73,781 votes and defeated Arbab Najeeb Ullah Khan, a candidate of Muttahida Majlis-e-Amal (MMA).

References

External links
Profile Sher Ali Arbab NA-30 Peshawar - MNA Profile

Living people
Pakistani MNAs 2018–2023
Year of birth missing (living people)